The girls' vault competition at the 2018 Summer Youth Olympics was held at the America Pavilion on October 13.

Qualification 

Qualification took place on October 8. Giorgia Villa from Italy qualified in first, followed by Ukraine's Anastasiia Bachynska and Emma Spence of Canada.

The reserves were:

Medalists

Results 
Oldest and youngest competitors

References 

Gymnastics at the 2018 Summer Youth Olympics